Javier Magro Matilla (born 16 August 1988) is a Spanish professional footballer who plays as a central midfielder for Greek Super League 2 club Athens Kallithea.

Club career
Matilla was born in Quero, Province of Toledo. After finishing his football development at Villarreal CF, he made his debut for the main squad on 4 April 2009: he started and finished the La Liga away match against UD Almería, but his team lost 3–0. In addition, he spent three full seasons with the reserves, one in the Segunda División and two in the Segunda División B.

On 28 June 2011, Matilla signed for Real Betis, recently returned to the top flight, for 3+1 years and €1.3 million. He made his official debut on 18 September, coming on as a substitute for Beñat Etxebarria in the dying minutes of a 3–2 away win over Athletic Bilbao.

Matilla was irregularly put to use during his four-and-a-half-year tenure in Andalusia, for example contributing 15 games and one goal as the club promoted in 2015. In the 2012–13 campaign, also in the second tier, he scored a career-best 12 goals whilst on loan to Real Murcia, including one in a 1–0 home victory against UD Las Palmas in the last matchday that certified survival.

In mid-October 2013, Matilla's contract was further extended until 2017, but it was mutually terminated on 15 January 2016 as the player was still nursing a serious knee injury. Subsequently, he went on trial with English Championship side Reading, but nothing came of it.

On 6 July 2016, Matilla signed for Elche CF in division two. After suffering relegation, he spent six months without a club before joining Gimnàstic de Tarragona.

On 10 July 2018, Matilla moved abroad for the first time in his career, joining Aris Thessaloniki F.C. on a one-year contract with the possibility of an additional season. On 14 January 2019, his first goal for the Greek team was scored through an injury-time free kick to help the hosts beat PAS Lamia 1964 1–0, and he repeated the feat on 17 February, this time against Panionios F.C. and also for the Super League and at the Kleanthis Vikelidis Stadium (1–1).

International career
Matilla's only cap with the Spain under-21 team arrived on 4 September 2009, as he played 15 minutes in a 2–0 win over Poland for the 2009 UEFA European Championship qualifying campaign, in Oviedo.

References

External links

1988 births
Living people
Sportspeople from the Province of Toledo
Spanish footballers
Footballers from Castilla–La Mancha
Association football midfielders
La Liga players
Segunda División players
Segunda División B players
Villarreal CF B players
Villarreal CF players
Real Betis players
Real Murcia players
Elche CF players
Gimnàstic de Tarragona footballers
Super League Greece players
Aris Thessaloniki F.C. players
Volos N.F.C. players
Spain under-21 international footballers
Spanish expatriate footballers
Expatriate footballers in Greece
Spanish expatriate sportspeople in Greece